Angeline Tubbs, aka The Witch of Saratoga, was a semi-legendary figure who lived in the area of Saratoga Springs, New York in the 1700s and 1800s.

Background 
Tubbs was born in England around 1761, in the Star and Garter Inn in the village of Watford in Northamptonshire. She became engaged to a British officer from the 31st (Huntingdonshire) Regiment of Foot and at age fifteen followed him when he was sent to the colonies to fight in the Revolutionary War. After the British defeat in the Battles of Saratoga, he abandoned her. With no place to go and knowing no one in a strange country, Tubbs supposedly walked fifteen miles through what was then uninhabited wilderness to the neighborhood of Saratoga Springs. There she settled at the base of a hill called Mount Vista, described as "a small mountain one mile north of the village", probably a promontory in the vicinity of Glen Mitchell— 

For many years Tubbs lived there in a hut surrounded by a brood of cats. She developed a reputation as a witch and made a living telling fortunes and trapping. Stone provides the following description:

Death and legacy 
Tubbs died in 1865 at the age of 104. Reportedly her ghost can still be seen haunting the woods and she is a popular subject for "ghost walks".

References 

1760s births
1865 deaths
18th-century English women
18th-century English people
18th-century occultists
19th-century American women
19th-century occultists
American centenarians
American ghosts
Fortune tellers
New York (state) folklore
People from Saratoga Springs, New York
Women centenarians
Supernatural legends
American folklore
American legends